The Women's 4 × 200 metres relay at the 2021 IAAF World Relays was held at Silesian Stadium on 2 May.

Records 
Prior to the competition, the records were as follows:

Results

Final

References 

2021 World Athletics Relays
4 × 200 metres relay
Relays